A number of ships of the French navy have borne the name Guerrier (male form of "warrior").

Ships named Guerrier 
 , a  74-gun ship of the line.
 Guerrier (1796), a gun-bearing boar, also named Bateau-canonnier no 1.
 Guerrier (1796), a gunboat.
  (1800), a xebec.

See also

Notes and references

Notes

References

Bibliography 
 
 

French Navy ship names